Stéphane Bancel (born July 20, 1972) is a French business executive. He is the chief executive officer (CEO) of the American pharmaceutical and biotechnology company Moderna, known for its COVID-19 vaccine. Before joining Moderna, Bancel was the CEO of French diagnostics company BioMérieux. Bancel is a partner at Flagship Pioneering, and has served on the boards of Indigo Agriculture, Boston's Museum of Science, and Qiagen. As of December 2022, his net worth was estimated at US$6 billion, owning about 8% of Moderna.

Early life
Bancel was born in Marseille, France. His father and mother were an engineer and doctor, respectively. He enjoyed computers, math, and science during his childhood. 

Bancel studied engineering at CentraleSupélec (former École Centrale Paris) and biological engineering at the University of Minnesota, earning master's degrees at both institutions. He went on to earn an MBA from Harvard Business School.

Career
Bancel was a sales director at Eli Lilly and Company, eventually becoming head of operations for Belgium. In 2007, he became CEO of French diagnostics company BioMérieux, and was credited with improving the company's margins. 

In 2011, Bancel joined Moderna as the CEO. Stat reported that Bancel led a highly secretive culture with little outside review of its science or research.

Personal life
Bancel has two children. In April 2020, with the Moderna share price rising on news of imminent phase 2 human trials for its potential COVID-19 vaccine, Bancel's stake of about 9% became worth over $1 billion. He lives in Boston, Massachusetts.

References
 

 
French billionaires
1972 births
Living people
École Centrale Paris alumni
University of Minnesota College of Science and Engineering alumni
Harvard Business School alumni
Paris-Saclay University alumni
21st-century French businesspeople
French chief executives
Moderna people